Odd Henriksen (born 1 March 1965) is a Norwegian politician for the Conservative Party. He was elected to the Parliament of Norway from Nordland in 2013, and was a member of the Standing Committee on Energy and the Environment from 2013 to 2017.

References 

Conservative Party (Norway) politicians
Members of the Storting
Nordland politicians
1965 births
Living people
21st-century Norwegian politicians
People from Fauske